WTSA-FM (96.7 FM) is a radio station licensed to serve Brattleboro, Vermont. It first signed on in 1975.  The station airs a hot adult contemporary music format.

The station was assigned the WTSA-FM call letters by the Federal Communications Commission on July 1, 1984.

Previous logo

References

External links
WTSA FM official website

TSA-FM
Hot adult contemporary radio stations in the United States
Radio stations established in 1975
1975 establishments in Vermont